

Justin Fontaine (born October 18, 1997) is an American former professional stock car racing driver. He last competed full-time in the NASCAR Camping World Truck Series, driving the No. 45 Chevrolet Silverado for Niece Motorsports.

Racing career
Before breaking into NASCAR, racing was a hobby for Fontaine. He raced quarter midgets, Mini Cup cars, late models, and drove a few races in the K&N Pro Series East.

In 2016, Fontaine made his Camping World Truck Series debut at Martinsville Speedway, driving the No. 22 Toyota for AM Racing. After starting 28th, he finished 26th, five laps behind race winner Johnny Sauter. Fontaine remained with AM Racing in 2017, driving on a part-time basis. His first race with AM was through a partnership with Bolen Motorsports, driving the No. 66 truck at Pocono Raceway. He then joined Niece Motorsports for a race later in the season.

On February 18, 2017, Fontaine was racing in the Lucas Oil Complete Engine Treatment 200, an ARCA Racing Series event at Daytona International Speedway. With five laps to go, he was involved in a multi-car wreck that sent him sliding on his roof. His car hit the outside wall in the tri-oval hard, and he had to be extricated from the car and was taken to nearby Halifax Medical Center. Due to damage to the SAFER barrier caused by Fontaine's hit, as well as the looming threat of rain that ended up postponing the Advance Auto Parts Clash to Sunday, the race was called at lap 75, with Austin Theriault the winner. Fontaine ended up with a L1 compression fracture from the accident.  He was cleared to return to racing on May 30, 2017 and hinted at a schedule that included another ARCA race and more NASCAR races. Fontaine ran most of the remaining ARCA events in Win-Tron Racing's No. 33 entry, running mostly just outside of the top ten. He scored a best finish of ninth at Winchester Speedway. 

On December 12, 2017, it was announced that Fontaine would pilot Niece Motorsports' No. 45 truck full-time in 2018, working alongside Austin Wayne Self. In his first race in the 45, Fontaine scored his first top ten in the Truck Series, finishing tenth. In an interview after the finish, Fontaine exuded happiness about the finish, saying in part "it’s nice because my Wikipedia stats are going to have one less zero in them!"

Two races later at Las Vegas, Fontaine scored his second top-10. Fontaine and the team struggled throughout the rest of the year, with multiple incidents and other misfortunes plaguing the team, which led them to a final points position of 16th.

On September 17, 2018, Fontaine announced that after the conclusion of the 2018 NASCAR Camping World Truck Series Season at Homestead–Miami Speedway he would step away from racing indefinitely.

Personal life
Fontaine's older cousin Chris has also competed in the Truck Series. Fontaine attends UNC Charlotte.

After ending his racing career, Fontaine interned for North Carolina Representative Patrick McHenry in 2019, and was promoted to deputy campaign manager for the following year's election cycle.

Motorsports career results

NASCAR
(key) (Bold – Pole position awarded by qualifying time. Italics – Pole position earned by points standings or practice time. * – Most laps led.)

Camping World Truck Series

K&N Pro Series East

 Season still in progress
 Ineligible for series points

ARCA Racing Series
(key) (Bold – Pole position awarded by qualifying time. Italics – Pole position earned by points standings or practice time. * – Most laps led.)

References

External links
 

Living people
1997 births
NASCAR drivers
ARCA Menards Series drivers
Racing drivers from North Carolina
People from Fletcher, North Carolina